Ygapema delicata is a species of beetle in the family Cerambycidae. It was described by French entomologist and naturalist Pierre-Émile Gounelle in 1911.

References

Clytini
Beetles described in 1911